Dave Williams is an American politician, retired engineer, and businessman serving as a member of the Iowa House of Representatives from the 60th district. Elected in 2018, he assumed office on January 14, 2019.

Early life and education 
Williams was born and raised in Iowa. The first in his family to attend a four-year university, he earned a Bachelor of Science degree in mechanical engineering from Iowa State University and a Master of Business Administration from University of Iowa.

Career 
Williams worked as an engineer at John Deere for 36 years, but was forced to retire after an injury. Williams later founded a small business and worked as an adjunct professor of business at the University of Northern Iowa.

References 

Living people
Democratic Party members of the Iowa House of Representatives
American mechanical engineers
Businesspeople from Iowa
Iowa State University alumni
University of Iowa alumni
Year of birth missing (living people)
21st-century American politicians